In Welsh-language poetry, cynghanedd (literally "harmony") is the basic concept of sound-arrangement within one line, using stress, alliteration and rhyme. The various forms of cynghanedd show up in the definitions of all formal Welsh verse forms, such as the awdl and cerdd dafod. Though of ancient origin, cynghanedd and variations of it are still used today by many Welsh-language poets. A number of poets have experimented with using cynghanedd in English-language verse, for instance Gerard Manley Hopkins. Some of Dylan Thomas's work is also influenced by cynghanedd.

Forms of cynghanedd 

Note that ⟨dd⟩, ⟨ll⟩ and ⟨ch⟩ are digraphs in the Welsh alphabet, each representing a single consonant /ð/, /ɬ/ and /χ/ respectively.

Cynghanedd groes ("cross-harmony") 

All consonants surrounding the main stressed vowel before the caesura must be repeated after it in the same order. However, the final consonants of the final words of each half of the line must be different, as must the main stressed vowel of each half. For example, from the poem Cywydd y Cedor, by the fifteenth-century poet Gwerful Mechain:

Here we see the pattern {C L Dd Dd [stress] L} present on both sides of the caesura. The main stressed vowels are ⟨a⟩ (a short monophthong) and ⟨wy⟩ (the diphthong /uj/).

The vowels other than those under the main stresses may be of any kind.

Cynghanedd draws (partial "cross-harmony") 

Exactly as in cynghanedd groes, except that there are consonants at the beginning of the second half of the line which are not present in the series of 'echoed' consonants. Cynghanedd draws appears in this line from R. Williams Parry:

Here the consonant sequence {Rh Ch Dd [stress]} is repeated with different stressed vowels (short ⟨e⟩ and long ⟨â⟩). It will be noticed that the ⟨n⟩ at the end of the first half plays no part in the cynghanedd: the line-final word iâ instead ends in a vowel; if this word also ended in an ⟨n⟩, there would be generic rhyme between the two words, which is not permitted in cynghanedd.

Note that the {D N} of the second half of the line is also not part of the cynghanedd: this is the difference between cynghanedd groes and cynghanedd draws. There may be any number of unanswered consonants in this part of the line, as long as the initial sequence of consonants and accent is repeated; compare an extreme possibility in a line of Dafydd ap Gwilym's The Girls of Llanbadarn, where only one syllable is repeated:

(Words beginning with ⟨h⟩ are treated as beginning with a vowel.)

Cynghanedd sain ("sound-harmony") 

The cynghanedd sain is characterised by internal rhyme. If the line is divided into three sections by its two caesuras, the first and second sections rhyme, and the third section repeats the consonantal patterns of the second. For example:

Cynghanedd lusg ("drag-harmony") 

The final syllable before the caesura in the first half of the line makes full rhyme with the penultimate syllable of the line-final polysyllabic word (i.e. the main stressed syllable of the second half). For example:

Other details 

A comprehensive account of cynghanedd would run to many thousands of words: many sub-types and subtleties must be accounted for by a full description of the system.

Internal rhyme in Breton
A form of cynghanedd lusg known as "internal rhyme" (Breton : klotennoù diabarzh, enklotennoù or kenganez) was frequently used in Middle Breton, between the XIIth and XVIIth centuries, in poetry, like in Pemzec Leuenez Maria or in the sonnet from Français Moeam, and theatre like in lots of misterioù, religious pieces, such as Buhez Sante Barba'. Two of the oldest works with internal rhymes are the Ivonet Omnes verses, which seem to be an old Breton lay and Dialog etre Arzuz Roe d'an bretounet ha Guiclaff, a prophetic text in dialogues.

This is an extract of An Dialog etre Arzur Roe d'an Bretounet ha Guynglaff (48-49 verses) :

Though it isn't as used as cynghanedd in Modern Welsh, some authors have published some work using this internal rhyme in poetry (Alan Botrel) or in the form of a lay like Lae Izold by Paskal Tabuteau.

Bibliography
Hopwood, Mererid (2004),  Singing in Chains: Listening to Welsh Verse. Llandysul: Gomer. .
Llwyd, Alan (2007), Anghenion y Gynghanedd. Barddas. 
Turco, Lewis (1986), The New Book of Forms: A Handbook of Poetics. University Press of New England: London. .
Emile Ernault, L'ancien Vers breton, Honoré Champion, 1912 ; republished by Brud Nevez, 1991

Notes

External links 
 For an example of a poem in English using cynghanedd, see the poem by Katherine Bryant at the end of this page. Note, however, that the poem suffers from the usual awkwardness resulting from the attempt to force English into the Welsh patterns. The cynghanedd here is also either incomplete or faulty in lines 1,2,3,7,8,11,12,14.
 A more thorough introduction to Welsh poetic forms
 Cynghanedd.com A website in Welsh devoted to the strict metres, where poets post their work and discuss.

Welsh poetry
Welsh-language literature
Medieval Welsh literature
Poetic devices
Poetic rhythm